Yuri Vladimirovich Zheludkov (born 8 March 1959 in Peterhof) is a Russian professional football coach and a former player.

Honours
 Soviet Top League champion: 1984.
 Soviet Top League bronze: 1980.
 USSR Federation Cup finalist: 1986.

European club competitions
With FC Zenit Leningrad.

 UEFA Cup 1987–88: 2 games, 1 goal.
 UEFA Cup 1989–90: 4 games.

External links
 Profile at rusteam.permian.ru
 

1959 births
Living people
Soviet footballers
Soviet expatriate footballers
Russian footballers
Russian expatriate footballers
Expatriate footballers in Sweden
Russian expatriate sportspeople in Sweden
Expatriate footballers in Israel
Russian expatriate sportspeople in Israel
Expatriate footballers in Finland
Russian expatriate sportspeople in Finland
Soviet Top League players
FC Dynamo Saint Petersburg players
FC Zenit Saint Petersburg players
Maccabi Netanya F.C. players
Russian football managers
FC Dynamo Saint Petersburg managers
Lesgaft National State University of Physical Education, Sport and Health alumni
Association football midfielders